Yoshiaki Kawashima (born 10 May 1934) is a Japanese long-distance runner. He competed in the marathon at the 1956 Summer Olympics.

References

1934 births
Living people
Athletes (track and field) at the 1956 Summer Olympics
Japanese male long-distance runners
Japanese male marathon runners
Olympic athletes of Japan
Place of birth missing (living people)